D92 may refer to:
 D 92 road (United Arab Emirates)
 HMS Liverpool (D92), a British Royal Navy destroyer
 Grünfeld Defence, Encyclopaedia of Chess Openings code
 "Hausmeister Thomas D. '92", a song by Die Fantastischen Vier from the album Jetzt geht's ab!